Bandera virginella is a species of snout moth in the genus Bandera. It was described by Harrison Gray Dyar Jr. in 1908, and is found in the US from southern Alberta and Washington, south through Colorado to California and New Mexico.

References

Moths described in 1908
Phycitinae
Taxa named by Harrison Gray Dyar Jr.